Field Commander Cohen: Tour of 1979 is a live album by Leonard Cohen, released in 2001. Songs were recorded live at the Hammersmith Odeon, London, on 4, 5, and December 6, 1979, and at the Dome Theatre, Brighton, on December 15, 1979. It has been said Cohen considered it his best tour ever.

Accompanying Cohen was the jazz band Passenger from Austin, Texas, consisting of members Steve Meador on drums, Roscoe Beck on bass, Mitch Watkins on guitar, Bill Ginn on keyboards and Paul Ostermayer on saxophone and flute. Other tour members included violinist Raffi Hakopian, oudist John Bilezikjian, and backup singers Laura Branigan, Jennifer Warnes and Sharon Robinson. Beck would become a stalwart of Cohen's studio and live bands for more than a decade afterwards. The album cover portrait was taken by Montreal photographer, Hazel Field.

Reception
James Hunter of Rolling Stone called the LP "elaborately, and yet simply, awesome."  Mark Deming of AllMusic writes that Field Commander Cohen "presents an especially strong argument for Cohen's gifts as a musician."  The New York Observer also praised the album:  "Mr. Cohen's voice is warm and strong throughout, and still has some of the high end that is not so evident on his last two studio albums..."

Track listing 
Written by Leonard Cohen, except where noted.
"Field Commander Cohen" – 4:25
"The Window" – 5:51
 violin solo by Raffi Hakopian
"The Smokey Life" – 5:34
 duet with Jennifer Warnes
"The Gypsy's Wife" – 5:20
 violin solo by Raffi Hakopian
"Lover Lover Lover" – 6:31
 includes two long oud solos by John Bilezikjian
"Hey, That's No Way to Say Goodbye" – 4:04
 violin solo by Raffi Hakopian
"The Stranger Song" – 4:55
"The Guests" – 6:05
 violin solo by Raffi Hakopian
"Memories" – (Cohen, Phil Spector) 4:38
 sax solo by Paul Ostermayer
"Why Don't You Try" – 3:43
 duet with Sharon Robinson, solo by Paul Ostermayer
"Bird on the Wire" – 5:10
 guitar solo by Mitch Watkins
"So Long, Marianne" – 6:44

Personnel

Performers 

 Leonard Cohen – vocals and guitar
 Jennifer Warnes – vocals
 Sharon Robinson – vocals
 John Bilezikjian – oud and mandolin
 Raffi Hakopian – violin

Passenger

 Roscoe Beck – bass
 Bill Ginn – keyboards
 Steve Meador – drums
 Paul Ostermayer – saxophone & flute
 Mitch Watkins – electric guitar

Production 

 Leanne Ungar – producer and engineer
 Bill Schnee – mixer
 Sharon Robinson – production consultant
 Bob Metzger – production consultant

References

External links
Album lyrics from The Leonard Cohen Files

Leonard Cohen live albums
2001 live albums